Vạn Ninh may refer to several places in Vietnam, including:

Vạn Ninh District, a rural district of Khánh Hòa Province
Vạn Ninh, Quảng Ninh, a rural commune of Móng Cái
Vạn Ninh, Bắc Ninh, a rural commune of Gia Bình District
Vạn Ninh, Quảng Bình, a rural commune of Quảng Ninh District